NGC 5003 is a spiral galaxy in the constellation Canes Venatici. The celestial object was discovered on April 9, 1787, by the German-British astronomer William Herschel.

References 

5003
Spiral galaxies
Canes Venatici